Receptaculites is the name-bearing genus for an extinct group of conspicuous benthic marine genera, the receptaculitids (formally Receptaculitaceae or Receptaculitidae), that lived from the Early Ordovician through the Permian period, peaking in the Middle Ordovician. The group's phylogenetic origin has long been obscure, with some arguing that they were calcareous algae, probably of the order Dasycladales. Receptaculitids lived in warm, shallow seas, but consensus disagreeing. They have been described from all continents except Antarctica. In some areas they were important reef-formers, and they also occur as isolated specimens.

Receptaculites and its relatives have a double-spiral, radiating pattern of rhombus-shaped plates supported by spindle-like objects called meroms.  Fossils can usually be identified by the intersecting patterns of clockwise and counterclockwise rows of plates or stalk spaces, superficially similar to the arrangement of disk florets on a sunflower—hence the common name "sunflower coral" (sic).

Receptaculitids have sometimes been compared to the morphologically similar, but probably distantly related, cyclocrinitids.

References

Paleozoic plants
Ulvophyceae genera
Fossil algae
Early Ordovician first appearances
Permian genus extinctions
Paleozoic life of Ontario
Paleozoic life of Alberta
Paleozoic life of British Columbia
Paleozoic life of Manitoba
Paleozoic life of Newfoundland and Labrador
Paleozoic life of the Northwest Territories
Paleozoic life of Nunavut
Paleozoic life of Quebec